Alberto Osvaldo Boggio (born 14 August 1969) is a former Argentine footballer.

References

1969 births
Living people
Argentine footballers
Argentina youth international footballers
Association football defenders
Rosario Central footballers
Estudiantes de La Plata footballers
Juventud Antoniana footballers
Tiro Federal footballers
San Martín de Tucumán footballers